The 1963 USAC Championship Car season consisted of 12 races, beginning in Trenton, New Jersey on April 21 and concluding in Phoenix, Arizona on November 17. There was also one non-championship event at Pikes Peak, Colorado.  The USAC National Champion  was A. J. Foyt, and the Indianapolis 500 winner was Parnelli Jones.  Jim Clark's win at Milwaukee in August marked the first win for a rear-engined car in Champ Car competition.

Schedule and results

 No pole is awarded for the Pikes Peak Hill Climb, in this schedule on the pole is the driver who started first. No lap led was awarded for the Pikes Peak Hill Climb, however, a lap was awarded to the drivers that completed the climb.

Final points standings

Notes
 
 
 http://media.indycar.com/pdf/2011/IICS_2011_Historical_Record_Book_INT6.pdf  (p. 268-269)

References

See also
 1963 Indianapolis 500

 
USAC Championship Car
1963 in American motorsport